Paul S. Crampton is the Chief Justice of Canada's Federal Court. He was appointed to the position in 2011 and to the court in 2009.

References

Living people
Judges of the Federal Court of Canada
University of Ottawa alumni
University of Toronto alumni
Université du Québec alumni
Year of birth missing (living people)